Peter Cornwell may refer to:

 Peter Cornwell (computer scientist) (born 1958), British computer scientist and media theorist
 Peter Cornwell (director), film director from Australia